Donald Koh Leng Kang (born 25 May 1968) is a Singaporean former badminton player. He is a one-time Olympian and a former national champion.

Career
Donald qualified for the 1992 Barcelona Olympics and competed in two events. That was also the year he defeated fellow Olympian Hamid Khan in the national championships to take the men's singles title.

He retired in 1994 after a decade of playing competitive badminton. He currently helps to promote an active lifestyle amongst Singaporeans with Speedminton, a new sport which combines badminton, squash and tennis.

Achievements

References

External links
 

1968 births
Living people
Place of birth missing (living people)
Singaporean male badminton players
Badminton players at the 1992 Summer Olympics
Olympic badminton players of Singapore